is a Japanese anime television series consisting of 24 episodes. It was directed by Kunihiko Yuyama and Yoshikata Nitta; it was  first broadcast on Tokyo Channel 12 (now TV Tokyo) in 1979.

References

External links
 
 

1979 anime television series debuts
Ashi Productions
Fantasy anime and manga
Fictional whales
Animated television series about mammals
TV Tokyo original programming